Frank Joseph Hince (13 January 1882 – 4 May 1945) was an Australian rules footballer who played with Fitzroy and Carlton.

Notes

References
Holmesby, Russell & Main, Jim (2009). The Encyclopedia of AFL Footballers. 8th ed. Melbourne: Bas Publishing.

External links

1882 births
1945 deaths
Australian rules footballers from Melbourne
Australian Rules footballers: place kick exponents
Fitzroy Football Club players
Carlton Football Club players
People from Carlton, Victoria